Sabrina Butler is a Mississippi woman who was eventually exonerated of all wrongdoing after initially being wrongfully convicted as a teenager for the alleged murder and child abuse of her nine-month-old son.

Death of baby
On April 11, 1989, teenage mother Sabrina Butler rushed her nine-month-old son, Walter Dean Butler, to the hospital after he suddenly stopped breathing. Doctors had attempted to resuscitate the child for thirty minutes, but failed, and Sabrina's baby died the same day.  On April 12, 1989, the day after her son died, Sabrina was arrested and charged with Capital Murder. There were bruises left by her resuscitation attempts and the resuscitation attempted by the hospital.

Trial
Sabrina Butler's murder trial commenced on March 8, 1990. At the trial, prosecutors sought to prove that Sabrina's account of the events leading to her son's death were false, and that she had inflicted the fatal wounds intentionally. Sabrina Butler did not testify at her trial. Sabrina was convicted of both murder and child abuse following her trial, and even though she was only a teenager, she became the only woman on Mississippi's Death Row in 1990, condemned to die by lethal injection.

Appeal
Following her conviction, Sabrina filed an appeal with the Supreme Court of Mississippi on several bases. The courts reversed and remanded her convictions on August 26, 1992. The court said that the prosecution had failed to prove that the incident was anything more than an accident.

Retrial
In 1995, Sabrina Butler's case went to retrial. By this time, more evidence emerged about how Sabrina did not murder her son. At the trial, one of Sabrina's neighbors had come forward with evidence that corroborated her account: that the injuries to her son occurred during the course of an unsuccessful attempt to administer CPR.  In addition, the medical examiner changed his opinion about Walter's cause of death, which he now believed occurred due to a kidney malady.  On December 17, 1995, Sabrina was acquitted and exonerated.

Today
When Sabrina was acquitted of murder, she had spent more than five years in prison and thirty-three months on death row. She is the first of two women in the United States to be exonerated from death row, the other being Debra Milke in Arizona.

Today, she is living in the same Mississippi town in which she was convicted, has remarried, and is raising three children. She is now hoping to be a criminal investigator.

Sabrina Butler-Porter had a book published in 2012, entitled Exonerated: The Sabrina Butler Story. She is also a storyteller in a collection of stories entitled "Pruno, Ramen and a Side of Hope, Stories of Surviving Wrongful Conviction.

See also
 List of wrongful convictions in the United States
List of women on death row in the United States

References 

Living people
American prisoners sentenced to death
Overturned convictions in the United States
Prisoners sentenced to death by Mississippi
People acquitted of murder
American people wrongfully convicted of murder
Year of birth missing (living people)